Yaroslav Dyblenko (born December 28, 1993) is a Russian professional ice hockey defenceman. He currently playing under contract with HC CSKA Moscow of the Kontinental Hockey League (KHL).

Playing career
Dyblenko made his Kontinental Hockey League (KHL) debut playing with Atlant Moscow Oblast during the 2012–13 KHL season before joining Spartak Moscow for the 2015–16 KHL season.

On April 20, 2017, Dyblenko signed a two-year, entry-level contract with the New Jersey Devils of the National Hockey League (NHL). Before the season, Dyblenko's KHL rights were traded from Spartak Moscow to perennial contenders SKA Saint Petersburg on August 18, 2017.

In the 2017–18 season, after attending New Jersey's training camp, Dyblenko was reassigned to American Hockey League affiliate, the Binghamton Devils for their inaugural year. While struggling to transition to the smaller ice, Dyblenko was relegated to a healthy scratch throughout the season and was unable to earn a recall to the NHL. He appeared in 54 games for just 8 points. In the off-season, Dyblenko's interest in returning to the KHL was confirmed as he was placed on unconditional waivers by the New Jersey Devils, in order to terminate the final year of his contract on May 9, 2018.

On May 18, 2018, Dyblenko initially agreed to terms with SKA Saint Petersburg on a four-year contract. However, with salary cap considerations and just three months later on August 16, 2018, Dyblenko was returned to former club, Spartak Moscow in a trade for financial compensation. Dyblenko played the 2018–19 season with Spartak Moscow before leaving in the off-season to return to SKA Saint Petersburg on a three-year contract on July 15, 2019.

Dyblenko went scoreless in 14 games to start the 2021–22 season, before he was traded by SKA to HC Sochi in exchange for financial compensation on 17 October 2021.

As a free agent from Sochi, Dyblenko agreed to a two-year contract with newly crowned champions, CSKA Moscow, on 4 May 2022.

Personal life
On June 24, 2017, in Moscow, Yaroslav married his wife Daria Dyblenko.

Career statistics

Regular season and playoffs

International

Awards and honours

References

External links

1993 births
Living people
Atlant Moscow Oblast players
Binghamton Devils players
HC CSKA Moscow players
Russian ice hockey defencemen
SKA Saint Petersburg players
HC Sochi players
HC Spartak Moscow players
People from Surgut